Francesco Marroccu, born in Cagliari, is an Italian Sporting Director of Verona Fc  who works as Sporting Director at Serie B side Ascoli, after previously holding the role of Sporting Director at then Serie A side Cagliari Calcio and working with their youth teams.

Career
Marroccu started his career at Sardinia based Italian side Nuorese Calcio as Sporting Director, before on 1 July 2015 being appointed by Massimo Cellino at Cagliari Calcio as Secretary General, then being promoted to Executive General in 2009, before becoming the club's Sporting Director in 2014.

On 12 September 2015, Marroccu ended his stay at Cagliari and joined Serie B Side Ascoli as Sporting Director.

References

Year of birth missing (living people)
Living people
Association football executives
Football people in Italy